Coy is an unincorporated community in Wilcox County, Alabama, United States.  Coy is located in a bend of the Alabama River and is home to several historic plantations.  The most notable of these is Dry Fork Plantation, included on the National Register of Historic Places.

Geography

Notable person
John Cooper Godbold, United States circuit judge for the United States Court of Appeals for the Eleventh Circuit, was born in Coy.

References

Unincorporated communities in Alabama
Unincorporated communities in Wilcox County, Alabama